Wesley James Modder (March 31, 1966 – August 19, 2021) was an American retired United States Marine Corps officer and military chaplain in the United States Navy. Modder was also occasionally an author in ETHOS, a US Navy newsletter.

Legal case
On December 6, 2014, Modder's temporary lieutenant junior grade officer and assistant brought two Equal Opportunity representatives and a five-page complaint against him. The complaint was on the grounds of discrimination of sexual orientation and different standards of respect including that of pre-marital sex. Modder was later removed from duties and told to clean out his office. After his commanders concluded he was "intolerant" and "unable to function in the diverse and pluralistic environment" he received a "detachment for cause" letter on February 27, 2015. On March 9, Modder sought assistance from Liberty Institute, which wrote a letter refuting the "detachment for cause" letter on legal grounds, and requested "religious accommodation" to continue his duties as a chaplain. This request was denied on March 16. Modder's lawyers appealed this ruling.

Modder was temporarily assigned and relocated to Naval Support Activity Charleston while facing possible discharge if brought before the Naval board of inquiry. On March 24, a sailor at a neighboring command unexpectedly died, Modder was going to attend and minister at the funeral when the US Navy issued a "no contact" order and banished him from the base. Liberty Institute stated "To deny Chaplain Modder of the ability to minister to a grieving family and other sailors is deplorable."

On September 3, the Navy Personnel Command exonerated Modder, clearing him of all wrongdoing. Rear Adm. David Steindler concluded that "evidence of substandard performance in this case does not meet the standard of gross negligence or complete disregard for duty". Liberty Institute, the law firm representing Wes Modder, stated "We always knew that when the facts came to light, the Navy would exonerate Chaplain Modder". He was able to retire in good standing upon reaching his 21st year of Naval service.

References

External links

 Chaplain Wesley Modder vs. US Navy – Biography and Legal Case

1966 births
2021 deaths
People from Flint, Michigan
People from Clio, Michigan
American Pentecostals
United States Marines
North Central University alumni
Bethel University (Minnesota) alumni
Assemblies of God pastors
United States Navy chaplains
Fuller Theological Seminary alumni
Military personnel from Charleston, South Carolina
Military personnel from Michigan